Chanfrau is a surname. Notable people with the surname include:

Frank Chanfrau (1824–1884), American actor and theatre manager
Henrietta Baker Chanfrau (1837–1909), American stage actress